Inés María Cañizares Pacheco (born 27 September 1970) is a Spanish economist and politician for the Vox party. She has been a member of the Congress of Deputies since November 2019 for the Toledo constituency.

Cañizares Pacheco completed a degree in business studies at the University of Castilla–La Mancha in 1993 followed by a Master's in economics at the Autonomous University of Madrid. During the November 2019 Spanish general election, she was placed second on the list for the Toledo constituency for the Congress of Deputies and was subsequently elected. In the Congress, she serves as a member of the Treasury Commission and the Budget Committee.

References 

1970 births
Living people
Members of the 14th Congress of Deputies (Spain)
Vox (political party) politicians
Spanish economists
Spanish women in politics